Joel A. Tarr (born 1934) is an American historian, currently the Richard S. Caliguiri University Professor of History and Policy at Carnegie Mellon University. His research includes environmental and urban development and systems and their effects.

Tarr co-authored a book with Clay McShane titled, Horse in the City: Living Machinces in the Nineteenth Century.

References

1934 births
Living people
21st-century American historians
21st-century American male writers
Carnegie Mellon University faculty
Northwestern University alumni
Rutgers University alumni
Leonardo da Vinci Medal recipients
American male non-fiction writers